Gosling or Goslings may refer to:
A young goose
Gosling (surname)

Places
Gosling Islands, South Orkney Islands, Antarctica

Music
"The Goslings", song by Frederick Bridge
The Goslings (band)
Gosling (band)

Other
Gosling Brothers, Ltd., a Bermuda rum manufacturer
Gosling Emacs, Emacs implementation by James Gosling

See also
Goslings (disambiguation)
Gosselin (disambiguation), a similar-sounding French surname